
Gmina Szczecinek is a rural gmina (administrative district) in Szczecinek County, West Pomeranian Voivodeship, in north-western Poland. Its seat is the town of Szczecinek, although the town is not part of the territory of the gmina.

Villages
Gmina Szczecinek contains the villages and settlements of: 
 
 Andrzejewo
 Białe
 Brzeźno
 Brzostowo
 Buczek
 Dąbrowa
 Dąbrówka
 Dalęcinko
 Dalęcino
 Dębowo
 Dębrzyna
 Dobrogoszcz
 Drawień
 Drężno
 Dziki
 Gałówko
 Gałowo
 Glinno
 Glonowo
 Godzimierz
 Gołębiewo
 Gołonóg
 Grąbczyn
 Grąbczyński Młyn
 Grochowiska
 Gwda
 Gwda Mała
 Gwda Wielka
 Jadwiżyn
 Janowo
 Jelenino
 Kępno
 Krągłe
 Krasnobrzeg
 Kusowo
 Kwakówko
 Kwakowo
 Łabędź
 Łączka
 Letnica
 Lipnica
 Łozinka
 Łysa Góra
 Malechowo
 Marcelin
 Miękowo
 Mosina
 Myślęcin
 Niedźwiady
 Nizinne
 Nowe Gonne
 Omulna
 Opoczyska
 Orawka
 Orłowce
 Panigrodz
 Parnica
 Parsęcko
 Pękowo
 Pietrzykowo
 Płużyny
 Siedlice
 Sierszeniska
 Sitno
 Skalno
 Skotniki
 Sławęcice
 Sławęcin
 Spore
 Spotkanie
 Stare Wierzchowo
 Strzeżysław
 Świątki
 Tarnina
 Trzcinno
 Trzebiechowo
 Trzebujewo
 Trzesieka
 Turowo
 Wągrodno
 Węglewo
 Wielisławice
 Wilcze Laski
 Wojnowo
 Zamęcie
 Zielonowo
 Żółtnica

Neighbouring gminas
Gmina Szczecinek is neighbored by the town of Szczecinek and by the gminas of Barwice, Biały Bór, Bobolice, Borne Sulinowo, Czarne, Grzmiąca, Okonek and Rzeczenica.

References
Polish official population figures 2006

Szczecinek
Szczecinek County